Eric Jablonowski is an American painter, Pennsylvania native, but now resides in Georgia. The artist is best known for his realism wildlife art and fine art landscapes. The artist's painting will be featured on the 2018 Delaware Trout Stamp.

References

External links

Year of birth missing (living people)
Living people
American landscape painters
American male painters
Wildlife artists